is a city in Kushiro Subprefecture on the island of Hokkaido, Japan. It serves as the subprefecture's capital and it is the most populated city in the eastern part of the island.

Geography

Mountains
 Mount Oakan
 Mount Meakan
 Mount Akan-Fuji

Rivers
 Kushiro River
 Akan River
 Shitakara River

Lakes
 Lake Akan
 Lake Harutori
 Lake Panketō
 Lake Penketō
 Lake Shunkushitakara

National Parks
 Kushiro-shitsugen National Park
 Akan National Park

Climate
Kushiro has a humid continental climate (Dfb) but its winter temperatures are less severe than those of inland East Asia at the same latitude. Its port is the most reliably ice-free throughout winter in all of Hokkaido, due to the lack of indentation in the coastline and absence of large inflows of cold fresh water nearby. It is also markedly sunnier than the extremely gloomy Kuril Islands to its north, being sheltered by Hokkaido's mountains from the heavy snowfalls produced on the Sea of Japan side by the Aleutian Low. It receives only a third as much snowfall as Sapporo and almost twice as much sunshine as the Kuril Islands are estimated to.

History
An Imperial decree in July 1899 established Kushiro as an open port for trading with the United States and the United Kingdom.

Kushiro has been an important port because it is more reliably ice-free during winter than alternative Russian Far East warm-water ports such as Petropavlovsk-Kamchatsky or other ports in Hokkaido such as Hakodate, which occasionally do freeze for short periods due to the lower salinity of the Sea of Japan. For this reason, Kushiro was considered a valuable target for the Tsars during the Russo-Japanese Wars, but it only became a really important port during the 1920s with the growth of commercial fishing, for which its reliable freedom from ice reduced costs.

In addition to its port, Kushiro is serviced by Kushiro Airport with flights from Honshu and by the Ōzora limited express train service, which runs six times per day to the main population centres in the west of Hokkaido.

In July 1945 the city of Kushiro was bombed by American naval aircraft, hundreds of people, mostly civilians, were killed. Following the Invasion of the Kuril Islands in August 1945, Kushiro was favoured by the Russians as the eastern cornerstone of a border between an American-occupied south and a Soviet-occupied north-coupled with Rumoi as the western cornerstone. However, these plans were cancelled after pressure by US President Harry S. Truman.

On October 11, 2005, the town of Akan, from Akan District, and the town of Onbetsu, from Shiranuka District, was merged into Kushiro. The town of Shiranuka now lies between the two sections of Kushiro.

Kushiro was one of the many Japanese cities to receive a Peace Pagoda. Built by the monks and nuns of the Buddhist order Nipponzan Myohoji, it was inaugurated in 1959.

Kushiro was accorded city status on 1 August 1922.
It is the sister city of Burnaby, British Columbia; Petropavlovsk-Kamchatsky, Russia; and Kholmsk, Russia.
1869: Kusuri becomes Kushiro.
1900: Kushiro becomes a First Class Municipality as Kushiro Town.
1920: Kushiro Town becomes Kushiro-ku. Kushiro Village (now Town) splits off.
1922: Kushiro-ku becomes Kushiro City.
1949: Tottori-cho was merged into Kushiro City.
2005: The old city of Kushiro City, Akan Town, and Onbetsu Town merged was expanded city of Kushiro City.

External relations

Twin Towns – Sister Cities

International
Sister Cities

Partner Cities

National
Sister Cities

Partner Cities

Sister ports
Port of Kushiro's sister ports are:
 Port of New Orleans, Louisiana, United States (since 1984)
 Port Stephens, New South Wales, Australia (since 1994)

Education

Universities

National
 Hokkaido University of Education, Kushiro Campus

Public
 Kushiro Public University of Economics

Colleges

National
 National Institute of Technology, Kushiro college

Private
 Kushiro junior College

High schools

Public
 Hokkaido Kushiro Koryo High School
 Hokkaido Kushiro Konan High School
 Hokkaido Kushiro Meiki High School
 Hokkaido Kushiro Commercial High School
 Hokkaido Kushiro Technical High School
 Hokkaido Kushiro Hokuyo High School
 Hokkaido Akan High School (Municipal)

Private
 Bushukan High School
 Ikegami Gakuen High School, Kushiro Campus

Transportation

Airways

Airport
Kushiro Airport

Railways

Conventional lines
Hokkaido Railway Company（JR Hokkaidō）
Nemuro Main Line : Chok- Onbetsu - (Shiranuka, Hokkaido) - Otanoshike - Shin-Otanoshike - Shin-Fuji - Kushiro - Higashi-Kushiro - Musa
Senmō Main Line : Higashi-Kushiro
Japan Freight Railway Company（JR Freight）
Nemuro Main Line：Kushiro Freight Terminal
Taiheiyō Coal Services
Rinkō Line

Roads

Expressways
Dōtō Expressway
Kushiro Sotokan Road

Japan National Route

Seaways

Seaport
Port of Kushiro

Sightseeing

Local attractions
Kushiro Wetland Park
Kushiro City Museum
Lake Akan
Lake Akan Kotan
Manabot Nusamai
Kushiro City Museum of Art
Moshiriya Chashi（Castle）
Itsukushima Jinja
Tottori Jinja

Culture

Sports
Ice hockey
Ice hockey is one of the most popular winter sports in Kushiro. In addition to several leagues devoted to amateur play of all ages, Kushiro is home to the Asia League Ice Hockey Nippon Paper Cranes, three time Asia League Champions.

Kushiro and many other cities are interested in hosting bandy teams. On January 8, 2017, the township of Akan hosted the first national championship, although the size of the field was a smaller version than the official rules for a bandy field. In January 2018, the first championship on a full-sized field took place in Shintoku, with participation from three teams, including FACEOFF Kushiro. The national team for women is based in Kushiro and made its World Championship debut in 2020.
East Hokkaido Cranes（Asia League Ice Hockey）
Kushiro Bears（Women's Japan Ice Hockey League）
Daishin（Women's Japan Ice Hockey League）

The Kushiro Ice Arena is the city's biggest stadion for ice hockey, figure skating and shorttrack.

Speed skating
The Yanagimachi Speed Skating Rink hosted the 2003 World Junior Speed Skating Championships and several Japanese Championships. It has an asphalt inline speed skating track on the middle field.

Notable people

Kazuhiko Chiba, footballer
Yutaka Fukufuji, ice hockey goaltender
Yukinobu Hoshino, manga artist
Akira Ifukube, composer
Keisuke Itagaki, manga artist
Saori Kitakaze, sprinter
Satoshi Kon, anime film director
Luna H. Mitani, visual artist
Hiromi Nagakura, photographer
Maki Nomiya, singer (Pizzicato Five)
Shinji Somai, film director
Aina Takeuchi, ice hockey defenseman
Kazuro Watanabe, astronomer

Mascot
She is a gentiana triflora flower (though she represents all flowers) from Onbetsu. Her favourite drink is milk.

References

External links

 
 Official Website 

 
Cities in Hokkaido
Port settlements in Japan
Populated coastal places in Japan